Bauko, officially the Municipality of Bauko  is a 4th class municipality in the province of Mountain Province, Philippines. According to the 2020 census, it has a population of 32,021 people.

History

Chico River Dam Project 
Bauko was one of several municipalities in Mountain Province which would have been flooded by the Chico River Dam Project during the Marcos dictatorship, alongside Bontoc, Sabangan, Sadanga, Sagada, and parts of Barlig.  However, the indigenous peoples of Kalinga Province and Mountain Province resisted the project and when hostilities resulted in the murder of Macli-ing Dulag, the project became unpopular and was abandoned before Marcos was ousted by the 1986 People Power Revolution.

Geography

Barangays
Bauko is politically subdivided into 22 barangays, divided into the upper and lower areas. These barangays are headed by elected officials: Barangay Captain, Barangay Council, whose members are called Barangay Councilors. All are elected every three years.

Climate

Demographics

Economy

Government
Bauko, belonging to the lone congressional district of the province of Mountain Province, is governed by a mayor designated as its local chief executive and by a municipal council as its legislative body in accordance with the Local Government Code. The mayor, vice mayor, and the councilors are elected directly by the people through an election which is being held every three years.

Elected officials

Members of the Municipal Council (2019–2022):
 Congressman: Maximo Y. Dalog Jr.
 Mayor: Abraham B. Akilit
 Vice-Mayor: Bartolome B. Badecao
 Councilors:
 Ashley T. Sili
 Simon C. Lacwasan
 Sabado T. Pussan Sr.
 Labor M. Masidong
 Stanly C. Dangatan
 Tomas B. Tanggacan
 Cornelio C. Matias
 Arcadio B. Taganas

Notable personalities
Maximo Dalog, Mt. Province Representative/congressman, lawmaker, governor, board member
Marky Cielo, actor

References

External links

 [ Philippine Standard Geographic Code]
Philippine Census Information

Municipalities of Mountain Province
Populated places on the Rio Chico de Cagayan